Hilary Sample is an American architect, principal, and co-founder of the award-winning architecture firm MOS Architects in New York City.

Education
Sample received a Master of Architecture with distinction from Princeton University (2003) and a Bachelor of Architecture from Syracuse University (1994).

Professional life
With partner Michael Meredith, she co-founded MOS Architects in 2003. Sample and Meredith teach at Columbia University and Princeton University, respectively, and their academic research occurs in parallel to the real-world constraints and contingencies of practice, informing both. Recent projects include four studio buildings for the Krabbesholm Højskole campus, the Museum of Outdoor Arts Element House visitor center, the Floating House on Lake Huron, and the Lali Gurans Orphanage and Learning Center in Kathmandu, Nepal.

In 2015, MOS Architects designed the exhibition The Other Architect at the Canadian Centre for Architecture in Montreal.

Awards
MOS has been honored with numerous awards including: The Cooper Hewitt, Smithsonian Design Museum’s National Design Award in Architecture in 2015, a 2014 Holcim Award, an Academy Award for Architecture from the American Academy of Arts and Letters, the Architectural League’s 2008 Emerging Voices Award, a National Endowment for the Arts Our Town grant and the P/A Award from Architect magazine.

Academic life
Sample is an Associate Professor at Columbia Graduate School of Architecture, Planning and Preservation. Prior to joining Columbia University, Sample taught at Yale University, University at Buffalo, where she was awarded the Reyner Banham Teaching Fellowship, and the University of Toronto. In 2015, Sample and Meredith served as the Fitzhugh Scott MasterCrit Chairs in Design Excellence at UW Milwaukee School of Architecture and Urban Planning 

Sample was a visiting scholar at the Canadian Centre for Architecture. Her writings have been published in Harvard Design Magazine, Log, Praxis, and Metropolis. Her research focuses on the intersection of architecture, health, environments, technology, and design.

Publications

 2012 Everything All at Once: The Software, Architecture, and Videos of MOS, Michael Meredith and Hilary Sample, Princeton Architectural Press
2015 MOS: Selected Works, Michael Meredith and Hilary Sample, Princeton Architectural Press
2015 Questions Concerning Health: Stress and Wellness in Johannesburg, edited by Hilary Sample, Columbia University, Graduate School of Architecture Planning and Preservation
2016 Maintenance Architecture, Hilary Sample, The MIT Press
2018 An Unfinished ... Encyclopedia of ... Scale Figures Without ... Architecture, edited by Michael Meredith, Hilary Sample & MOS, The MIT Press
2019 A Constant Search for Architecture: Michael Meredith and Hilary Sample on a Curious Journey, essay by Michael Meredith and Hilary Sample, Canadian Centre for Architecture
2019 Houses for Sale, Michael Meredith, Hilary Sample, Canadian Centre for Architecture and Corraini Edizioni

References

External links
 MOS Architects website

Princeton University alumni
Syracuse University alumni
20th-century American architects
Columbia University faculty
Living people
Columbia Graduate School of Architecture, Planning and Preservation faculty
Year of birth missing (living people)
University at Buffalo faculty
21st-century American architects
American women architects